Ornativalva aspera is a moth of the family Gelechiidae. It was described by Sattler in 1976. It is found in Mongolia.

References

Moths described in 1976
Ornativalva